Epiplema is a genus of moths in the family Uraniidae described by Gottlieb August Wilhelm Herrich-Schäffer in 1855. A number of species have been reassigned to Europlema.

Description
Palpi porrect (extending forward), projecting beyond the frons. Forewings with vein 5 from the upper angle of cell and veins 6, 7 and 8, 9 stalked. Vein 10 usually from cell, rarely stalked with 8 and 9. Hindwings with veins 3 and 4 from angle of cell. Vein 5 from middle of discocellulars and veins 6 and 7 from upper angle. Wings held more or less apart in repose.

Species
Epiplema acutangularia Herrich-Schäffer, [1855]
Epiplema albida
Epiplema angulata Warren, 1896
Epiplema argillodes Turner, 1903
Epiplema certaria (Walker, 1861)
Epiplema clathrata Warren, 1896
Epiplema coeruleotincta Warren, 1896
Epiplema exornata (Eversmann, 1837)
Epiplema himala (Butler, 1880)
Epiplema horrida (Warren, 1896)
Epiplema incolorata (Guenée, 1857)
Epiplema irrorata (Moore, 1887)
Epiplema latifasciata (Moore, 1887)
Epiplema leucosema Turner, 1911
Epiplema quadristrigata (Walker, 1866)
Epiplema saccata (Holloway, 1998)
Epiplema stereogramma (Turner, 1903)
Epiplema tenebrosa Hampson
Epiplema thiocosma Turner, 1911

References

Uraniidae